Phaeochlaena costaricensis is a moth of the family Notodontidae first described by James S. Miller in 2008. It is found in Costa Rica and Panama.

The length of the forewings is 15-18.4 mm for males and 18-21.5 mm for females. The forewings are dark blackish brown, with three orange-yellow maculations. The central area of the hindwings is orange yellow, with a blackish-brown marginal band extending from the apex to the tornus.

Etymology
The name refers to Costa Rica, one of the countries the species occurs in.

References

Moths described in 2008
Notodontidae